"Funny, Funny" is a song by British band the Sweet released in January 1971. It was the first single from their debut album Funny How Sweet Co-Co Can Be and became their first chart hit, peaking at number 13 on the UK Singles Chart.

Robin Carmody of Freaky Trigger described the "particularly fine" song as the strongest example of the Sweet's early bubblegum sound, before the group's music became heavier.

Track listing
7"
 "Funny, Funny" – 2:46
 "You're Not Wrong for Loving Me" – 2:45

Charts

Weekly charts

Year-end charts

References

1971 songs
1971 singles
The Sweet songs
Songs written by Nicky Chinn
Songs written by Mike Chapman
Song recordings produced by Phil Wainman
RCA Records singles
Ultratop 50 Singles (Flanders) number-one singles
Dutch Top 40 number-one singles
Number-one singles in Germany
Number-one singles in South Africa
Number-one singles in Sweden
Bubblegum pop songs